California macrophylla, commonly known as roundleaf stork's bill, is a species of flowering plant in the geranium family, Geraniaceae. It was formerly placed in the genus Erodium, but was later placed in a monotypic genus of its own named California.

Description
It is native to the southwestern United States and northern Mexico, where it grows in open habitat such as grassland and scrub. It is an annual herb that grows only a few centimeters high (1 inch), forming a patch of slightly lobed, somewhat kidney-shaped to rounded leaves on long, slender petioles. Leaves are green dorsally and purple ventrally, often developing clear red veins once the leaves mature. The inflorescence is a fragile umbel of flowers with petals around a centimeter long and white in color, often tinted pinkish or purplish. Petals break off easily and flowers rarely stay pristine for more than a day. The fruit has a fuzzy base and a long, narrow style which may reach  in length.

References

External links
Jepson Manual Treatment
USDA Plants Profile
UC Berkeley California macrophylla photo gallery

Geraniaceae
Flora of the Southwestern United States
Plants described in 1838